Carpenterie Pagotto Srl, also sometimes called Pagotto Carpenterie, is an Italian aircraft manufacturer based in Pianzano. The company was founded by designer Enio Pagotto and specializes in the design and manufacture of autogyros and ultralight trikes.

Pagotto established his company initially to produce trikes and built his reputation on them, he then expanded into autogyro design.

Aircraft

References

External links

Aircraft manufacturers of Italy
Autogyros
Ultralight trikes
Homebuilt aircraft